Athletics was contested at the 1958 Asian Games in National Stadium, Tokyo, Japan from May 25 to May 29.

Medalists

Men

Women

Medal table

References
Asian Games Results. GBR Athletics. Retrieved on 2014-10-04.
Women's relay medallists. Incheon2014. Retrieved on 2014-10-04.
Men's relay medallists. Incheon2014. Retrieved on 2014-10-04.

 
1958 Asian Games events
1958
Asian Games
1958 Asian Games
1958 Asian Games